Amanullah Khan Afshar was the fourth khan of the Zanjan Khanate from 1797 to 1810.

References

 Anvar Changhiz Oglu, Aydın Avşar, Avşarlar, Bakı, "Şuşa", 2008,

People from Zanjan, Iran

Zanjan Khanate
Ethnic Afshar people